Hyrcanus may refer to
John Hyrcanus, Jewish High Priest 134-104 BCE
Hyrcanus II, King of Judea 67–66 BCE
Eliezer ben Hurcanus or Hyrcanus, prominent sage in Judea in the 1st and 2nd centuries CE
 Hyrcanus, the son of Tobias, one of the Jewish Tobiads of the 2nd century BCE